The Malawi national netball team, nicknamed "The Queens", represent Malawi in international netball competitions.

History
Malawi have played in six World Netball Championships, famously finishing fifth in 2007. The Queens are coached by Peace Chawinga Kalua who replaced Whyte Mlilima, who was appointed as caretaker head coach after former coach late Griffin Saenda had to withdraw from the team on medical grounds. As of  November 2022, the team are sixth on the World Netball Rankings.

In 2012 they competed in the Fast5 tournament in Auckland, where they have had several historic results including wins over Australia and England, and finished in 5th place, just narrowly missing out on the finals. This followed a draw against Australia in the 2010 Edition. Airtel Malawi is a significant financial donor of the Malawi Queens, having sponsored their trip to Auckland for the Fast5 World Series in 2014 to a sum of K6 M. The current Netball Association of Malawi (NAM) president is Abigail Shariff.

At the 2018 Commonwealth Games, Malawi defeated the second-ranked team in the world, New Zealand, for the first time in history.

In 2022, Malawi Competed at the Commonwealth Games, in Birmingham.

By virtue of its position in the World Netball Rankings (as of 28 July 2021), Malawi qualified for the tournament.

Partial fixtures were announced in November 2021, then updated with the remaining qualifiers in March 2022. Malawi finished fourth in their group at the competition behind hosts England, New Zealand and Uganda.

 Summary

 Roster

 Joyce Mvula
 Jane Chimaliro
 Sindi Simtowe
 Takondwa Lwazi
 Thandi Galeta
 Bridget Kumwenda
 Shira Dimba
 Martha Dambo
 Caroline Mtukule
 Towera Vinkhumbo
 Loreen Ngwira
 Jasinta Kumwenda

 Group play

Source: Birmingham 2022

(H) Host

 Seventh place match

Players

2019 Netball World Cup roster 
 Thandie Galleta
 Joanna Kachilika
 Bridget Kumwenda
 Takondwa Lwazi
 Sindi Simtowe
 Towera Vinkhumbo
 Jane Chimaliro
 Alinafe Kamwala
 Caroline Mtukule
 Grace Mwafulirwa
 Loreen Ngwira

2018 Commonwealth Games team

Notable past players
 Mary Waya
 Connie Mhone

Competitive history

References
6. Malidadi, Mphatso (29 November 2022). https://times.mw/nam-yet-to-pick-queens-assistant-coach/?amp=1

National netball teams of Africa
Netball in Malawi
Netball